Phil Danaher may refer to:

 Phil Danaher (American football) (born 1948), American football coach
 Phil Danaher (rugby union) (born 1965), retired Irish rugby union player